Mary Villiers may refer to:
 Mary Villiers, Countess of Buckingham (c. 1570–1632)
 Mary Villiers, Duchess of Buckingham (1638–1704)
 Mary Stewart, Duchess of Richmond (1622–1685), formerly Lady Mary Villiers
 Mary Villiers, Lady Herbert of Shurland, a c. 1636 oil painting by Anthony van Dyck of Mary Stewart, Duchess of Richmond